Wolf's Hole is a 1986 Czechoslovak science fiction horror film directed by Věra Chytilová. It was entered into the 37th Berlin International Film Festival. The film can be characterized as moralizing horror, but may also be interpreted as an allegory for the atmosphere surrounding the normalization period.

Plot
A group of teenagers are invited to a skiing workshop in the mountains, without being told how or why they were picked as participants. There are eleven of them, but the camp supervisors insist that there should be only ten, and that one of them is an intruder. As the group find themselves cut off from the outside world, strange things begin to happen; the supervisors seem intent to create an atmosphere of hostility, turning the participants against each other, even urging them to kill each other. The supervisors eventually reveal themselves as extraterrestrials who demand that the group pick one among them to be sacrificed. They refuse, however, and in a panic set the cottage on fire and make a narrow escape on a lift used for timber transport, leaving no man behind.

Cast
 Miroslav Macháček as Daddy
 Tomás Palatý as Dingo
 Stepánka Cervenková as Babeta
 Jan Bidlas as Honza
 Rita Dudusová as Gitka
 Irena Mrozková as Linda
 Hana Mrozkovy as Lenka
 Norbert Pycha as Marcipan
 Simona Racková as Gaba
 Roman Fiser as Jozka
 Frantisek Stanek as Petr
 Radka Slavíková as Emilka
 Jitka Zelenková as Brona
 Petr Horacek as Alan

Awards and nominations
The film was nominated for the Golden Bear for Best Film at the 1987 Berlin Film Festival.

References

External links

1986 films
1986 horror films
1980s science fiction horror films
1980s Czech-language films
Czechoslovak science fiction horror films
Films directed by Věra Chytilová
Czech science fiction horror films
1980s Czech films